"Incomplete" is a song by American vocal group Backstreet Boys from their fifth studio album, Never Gone (2005). The power ballad was released on April 11, 2005, as the group's first single since they decided to reunite after a two-year hiatus. It was written by Dan Muckala, Lindy Robbins, and Jess Cates, and it was produced by Muckala with Kevin Richardson on piano. According to Billboard magazine's Chuck Taylor, the song is an "emotion-packed, grown-up tome about relationship struggle and strife."

"Incomplete" marked a stylistic change for the band, with member AJ McLean saying that the band wanted to break away from the image they had attained during the 1990s and early 2000s. The song was a commercial success, peaking at number 13 on the US Billboard Hot 100 and earning a gold certification for selling over half a million copies in the US. It also reached the top 10 in several European countries and debuted at number one in Australia, where it became the group's only number-one hit and received a double-platinum sales certification in 2020.

Critical reception
Chuck Taylor from Billboard magazine compared the band's vocals to those of Bryan Adams and Blessid Union of Souls, going on to say that the song would be refreshing to hear on the radio "like crisp white sheets." British columnist James Masterton wrote that "Incomplete" proved that the band had not lost their talent following their hiatus, going on to call the track's production "bombastic".

Music video
Directed by Joseph Kahn, the music video for "Incomplete" sets the band in an arid desert environment and features each of the band members in a different element or force of nature: Brian Littrell, water; Nick Carter, fire; Howie Dorough, rain; Kevin Richardson, snow; and AJ McLean, the Sun.

Track listings

UK CD1
 "Incomplete" – 3:59
 "Incomplete" (instrumental) – 3:59

UK CD2; European and Australian maxi-CD single
 "Incomplete" – 3:59
 "My Beautiful Woman"  – 3:36
 "Movin' On"  – 3:30
 "Incomplete" (video)

European CD single
 "Incomplete" – 3:59
 "Movin' On" – 3:30

Japanese CD single
 "Incomplete" (album version) – 3:59
 "Incomplete" (instrumental) – 3:59
 "My Beautiful Woman" (album version)  – 3:36
 "My Beautiful Woman" (instrumental)  – 3:36

Personnel
Personnel are lifted from the Never Gone liner notes.

 Dan Muckala – writing, additional keyboards, string arrangement, production, recording
 Lindy Robbins – writing
 Jess Cates – writing
 Brandon Heath – acoustic guitar
 Alex Nifong – electric guitar
 Chris McMurtry – electric guitar
 Brent Milligan – bass guitar
 Kevin Richardson – piano
 Joe Porter – drums
 David Dillbeck – recording
 F. Reid Shippen – additional engineering
 Skye McCaskey – additional engineering
 Lee Bridges – additional engineering assistance
 Aaron Fessel – additional engineering assistance
 Chris Lord-Alge – mixing
 Tom Coyne – mastering

Charts

Weekly charts

Year-end charts

Certifications

Release history

Cover versions
In 2017, international symphonic metal supergroup Exit Eden covered "Incomplete" as the 3rd track of their debut album entitled Rhapsodies in Black.

References

2005 songs
2005 singles
2000s ballads
Backstreet Boys songs
Jive Records singles
Music videos directed by Joseph Kahn
Number-one singles in Australia
Number-one singles in the Czech Republic
Number-one singles in Hungary
Song recordings produced by Dan Muckala
Songs written by Dan Muckala
Songs written by Jess Cates
Songs written by Lindy Robbins